Kaushal Yadav is an Indian politician. He was elected to the Bihar Legislative Assembly from Nawada Member of Bihar Legislative Assembly as a member of the Janata Dal (United).

References

Living people
People from Nawada district
Bihar MLAs 2005–2010
Bihar MLAs 2010–2015
Bihar MLAs 2015–2020
Janata Dal (United) politicians
Janata Dal politicians
Year of birth missing (living people)